Alicella gigantea is the largest species of amphipod ever observed, with some individuals reaching up to  long. The average length of A. gigantea ranges from 72.5 to 141.0 millimeters, and its weight ranges from 4.2 to 45 grams[4]. Comparatively to other amphipods, the A. gigantea grows at a much faster rate. Formerly included in the family Lysianassidae, a new family, Alicellidae, was erected in 2008 for Alicella and five related genera. The species lives only at great depths; the first specimens were collected at the end of the 19th century from the Madeira Abyssal Plain, and subsequent specimens have been found in other abyssal plains of both the Atlantic and Pacific Oceans, as well as from the Kermadec Trench in the southwest Pacific. One specimen was found in the stomach of a black-footed albatross, but is thought to have been dead before it was eaten.

The size of this species of amphipod is hypothesized to be connected to oxygen availability. A. gigantea have gills on coxa 7 and tubiliform accessory lobes. These additional structures allow for A. gigantea to absorb more oxygen, which is a known contributor to gigantism. The size of A. gigantea also allows them to avoid being preyed on by potential predators such as Notoliparis kermadecensis, a liparid that preys on smaller amphipods.

References

Gammaridea
Monotypic crustacean genera
Crustaceans described in 1899